Nivia  is an Indian corporate and sports equipment manufacturing industry founded in 1934 at Sialkot and named Freewill Sports Pvt Ltd. Later the company shifted to Mumbai and finally headquartered in Jalandhar, Punjab, India which designs and manufactures sports equipment, accessories, and sportswear including athletic clothes, and footwear. It has been the official ball partner for most reputed national and international leagues and tournaments including Hero Indian Super League, The Basketball Federation of India, All India Football Federation, Volleyball Federation of India, Sri Lanka Super League. Nivia's basketball has received certification from FIBA, the International Basketball Federation. Nivia is one of the homegrown Indian brands that is competing with international and global giants Adidas, Nike, and Puma. 

The company was started by Nihal Chand Kharabanda, at Sialkot under the name Freewill Sports Pvt Ltd in 1934. Later his son Vikaran Singh joined the brand to manage further. "Nivia" is the combined name that is coined from the initial two letters of the first names of Nihal Chand Kharabanda the founder of Freewill, and his son Vikaran Singh.  So "Ni" and "Vi" is joined together to create the brand name Nivia..

History

The founder's era 
Freewill was established in 1934 at Sialkot, now in Pakistan, by Nihal Chand Kharabanda. After the partition of the Indian subcontinent into two separate countries of India and Pakistan, the company shifted its base from Sialkot to Mumbai, India. From Mumbai, it shifted to Meerut and finally settled down in Jalandhar, Punjab in 1950. He was a post-graduate in political science from Jalandhar, Punjab and joined the National Institute of Sports in Patiala, Punjab to enhance his knowledge about sports equipment and worked according to the needs of Indian sports industries.

Vijay Kharbanda era 
In 1962, Vijay Kharbanda the son of founder Nihal Chand Kharabanda joined the family business.  He introduced the nozzles in football to the sports equipment manufacturing industry. The brand Nivia was registered in 1962 and the letters "VI" of the brand name were taken from his first name.

The company launched a full range of hand-stitched leather balls for football, volleyball, and basketball games.

Rajesh Kharbanda era 
In 1991, Rajesh Kharbanda, son of Vijay Kharbanda, joined the company. 

In 2005, Rajesh Kharbanda was appointed as the managing director. He put his experience and succeed to get certification for basketball from the International Basketball Federation.

In 2015, Rajesh Kharbanda signed a partnership with BRICS Football Cup, and Nivia has become the official ball partner of BRICS. The agreement was signed in the presence of H. E Tovar da Silva Nunes, the ambassador of Brazil in India.  

In 2021, His efforts to get approval from the FIBA and BFI were worthy and Nivia became the official ball partner af all matches played under Basketball Federation of India. The ball has been used by both junior-level and national-level competitions.  

In 2022, Rajesh Kharbanda along with Abhishek Bachchan, and Vita Dani the co-owner of Chennaiyin FC had launched a kit for the 2022–23 season. This includes all three home, away, and third together. These were designed by the fans through a contest held during the year 2022.

Rajesh Kharbanda successfully took the challenge of designing the special shoes for para-badminton star Nilesh Gaikwad. These shoes were manufactured by keeping his legs parameters which increase the speed and the side body movement of Nilesh Gaikwad while playing. Mr. Kharbanda did not charge any cost for the specially designed shoes. The shoes have transformed Nilesh's sporting dream and career. Nilesh attributed the win of the bronze medal of the Spanish para-badminton international level 1 tournament to these Nivia shoes.

Rajesh Kharbanda is also appointed as Chairperson by SGMEA, he projected a workforce to work remotely for stitching footballs. This would help workers who couldn't resume their jobs after the pandemic.

Products 

Nivia Sports manufactures and markets sports products, sports wear, bags and accessories used for training and competition for sports including football, volleyball, basketball, handball, cricket, running, fitness etc.

Football 

Nivia Sports was the first Indian sports equipment manufacturer to produce hand stitched balls, including footballs. In the 1950s, under Freewill Sports Pvt Ltd, Nivia Sports started manufacturing hand-stitched leather footballs, basketballs, and volleyballs. The company exported its balls to international markets, with its first consignment of 30 balls shipped to Indonesia. In the 1960s Nivia football received the approval of the National Itute of Sports, Patiala, Punjab, India. Its football became the official ball for the National Football Championship and for the All India Football Federation (AIFF). In the 1980s, Nivia was selected as the official ball for the International Football Tournament Jawaharlal Nehru Gold Cup and South Asian Federation (SAF) Games.

Nivia Sports has also produced and sponsored other accessories related to football, such as boots, uniforms, goalkeeper gloves, goal nets, training gear, shin guards, ball pump.

NIVIA Sports introduced Astra, the official match ball for Indian Super League 2021–2022.
The soccer ball is made with PU micro-fiber leather, in 8-panel structure which technically reduces the seam length by 23%. Astra replaced Ashtang soccer ball in the new season.

Basketball 

Nivia makes handmade balls. The basketball initially goes to a machine where a rubber blob is squeezed to flatten it to a thinner size, giving it a round shape. Then other stitching, and painting works are done manually by hand. CNNMoney showed the making of basketballs in Nivia's factory in Jalandhar (Punjab), India.

NIvia Sports's basketball 'Top Gear 3.0' has received certification from FIBA, the International Basketball Federation. Nivia has become the official ball partner for the BFI, the Basketball Federation of India from 2021 until 2025. It has provided official match balls for all matches organised by the BFI and FIBA.

Volleyball 

In 1963, the Nivia volleyball was selected to be used as the official ball in the Pre-Olympic Volleyball Championship organised in New Delhi, India.

VAYU is the latest volleyball from NIVIA, which is India's first 12-panel ball.

Cricket 
Nivia Sports also manufactures cricket balls, and cricketing apparels.

Athletic shoes 

During the 1980s, Nivia Sports started manufacturing sports footwear in India. Through the years, the company added footwear for use in other games such as cricket, football, basketball, volleyball, badminton, tennis, kabaddi, wrestling, and track & field. They also produced shoelaces and gel insoles.

Football boots 

 
The series of shoes includes identical properties as per their categories. It involves, Aviator, Brasil, Crane, Dominator, Ditmar, Destroyer, England, Encounter, Pro Encounter, Germany, Invader, Oslar, Oslar blade, Premier, Premier Carbonite, Premier Cleats, Spain,  Tough, and Ultra.

Apparels 

Nivia sports has been appointed as the official apparel partner for BFI and FIBA Backed 3x3 Pro Basketball League.

Jersey 

Nivia Sports manufactures jerseys for all sports. It has been the official sports partner for many of the sports clubs.  Nivia Jerseys are made up of micro polyester and Nivia is the official partner for the largest clubs like ATK Mohun Bagan FC, Chennaiyin FC and sports leagues as ISL, FIBA, BFI.

Accessories 
Nivia Sports produces sports accessories such as kits or bags, tracksuits, shorts, lowers, shocks, and windcheaters for use in cricket, football, basketball, and volleyball. The company has contributed sports equipment, footwear and accessories including badminton rackets and shuttlecocks, strings, skateboards, skating wheels, squash rackets, and swimming accessories like earplugs, fins, masks, and aqua boards.

Sponsorships

BasketBall
  Basketball Federation of India

Futsal
  Futsal Club Championship

Football

National Teams
  Bhutan

Federations and associations
   Bhutan Football Federation (Official match ball sponsor)

Clubs Teams
   ATK (Football Club) (2015–19)
   Colombo FC (2018–present)
   DSK Shivajians FC (2015–17)
   Shillong Lajong FC (2017–18)
   Jamshedpur FC (2017–present)
   ATK Mohun Bagan (2020–present)
   Chennaiyin FC (2021–present)
   Chennai City FC (2019–present)
   TRAU FC (2019–20)
  Corbett FC (2021–present)
   Churchill Brothers (2011–17; 2018–present)
   Sreenidi Deccan FC (2016–present)
  NEROCA FC (2021–present)
  Real Kashmir FC (2022–present)

Domestic leagues

   Indian Super League (Official match ball and staff officials kit sponsor) (2018–present)
  I-League
  I-League 2nd Division
  Durand Cup
   Nepal Super League (Official match ball sponsor)
   Sri Lanka Super League (Official match ball sponsor)
  Kerala Women's League

References

Athletic shoe brands
Companies based in Punjab, India
Indian brands
Manufacturing companies established in 1934
Sporting goods brands
Sporting goods manufacturers of India
Sportswear brands
Indian companies established in 1934